Stigmella kimae is a moth of the family Nepticulidae. It is known from Belize.

External links
Nepticulidae and Opostegidae of the world

Nepticulidae
Moths of Central America
Moths described in 2000